Sphaerophoria philanthus is a species of syrphid fly in the family Syrphidae. It is found in Europe.

References

Syrphini
Articles created by Qbugbot